Ayorinde Kehinde Okiki (born 4 August 1992), known professionally as DJ Kaywise is a Nigerian disc jockey and record producer. Kaywise broke into the mixtape market in Alaba in the year 2010. He has since gained prominence as a DJ in Nigeria and has released chart topping songs with many Nigerian music stars.

Early life 
DJ Kaywise was born in Lagos, Nigeria on August 4, 1992. He is originally from Ile Ife in Osun state. He was brought up in Lagos State where he completed his elementary and secondary school. He gained prominence after releasing the mixtape titled "Emergency" which was a combination of songs in the country at the time.

Career 
DJ Kaywise started his career as a record producer but later picked interest in being a Disc Jockey. He started his journey as a DJ in 2010, he came into limelight after his "Emergency" mixtape broke into the mixtape market in Alaba market in Lagos. He has so far released over 10,000 CD Mixtape, over 50 online released mixtape and released multiple music and visuals with Nigerian and African artistes.

Kaywise released his debut single in 2012 titled "Hangover" featuring Dammy Krane and Yung 6ix. In 2013, he featured Iyanya on a single titled "Loyalist". He has released singles with Nigerian musicians including Mayorkun, Naira Marley, Tiwa Savage, Olamide, Vector and Ice Prince. He kickstarted his DJ academy in 2019 called Kaywise Academy. then released a mixtape titled "Revolution Mix Vol1" in solidarity with the EndSars  movement that started in Nigeria in 2020. In August 2020, his single "What Type of Dance" featuring Mayorkun, Naira Marley and Zlatan Ibile peaked at number 5 on the Billboard Top Triller Global chart. His recently released song "High Way" featuring Phyno dropped in December 2020. The single peaked at number 7 after spending two weeks on the Billboard Top Triller Global Chart.

The Joor Concert 
DJ Kaywise hosted the maiden edition of his street concert titled " The Joor Concert" in 2016. He mentioned in an interview that the first four editions of the concert had an attendance record of over 50,000 (Unverifiable) DJ Kaywise had the fifth edition of his annual street concert in January 2020. Over the years, The Joor Concert has been hosted in different cities across the country and has had two editions in London and Dubai respectively.

Discography

Mixtapes 

 Good TImes Mixtape
 Best of The Mavins & Friends
 Revolution Mix Vol 1
 ''Joor, Vol. 1 & 2 (featuring Emmyblaq)

Singles 

 "Hangover"  (2012)
"Loyalist"  (2013)
 "Feel Alright"  (2014)
 "Warn Dem"  (2015)
 "Ibeji"  (2015)
 "Informate"  (2017)
 "Caro" (2016)
 "Juju"  (2017)
 "Alert"  (2018)
 "See Mary See Jesus"  (2018)
 "Normal Level"  (2018)
 "W.T.O.D"  (2020)
"HighWay"  (2021)

Awards and nominations

References

External links 
 Official Website

Living people
Nigerian record producers
Nigerian DJs
1992 births
People from Osun State